The Yorkshire Purchasing Organisation, referred to as YPO is a publicly owned central purchasing body based in Wakefield, Yorkshire. It is owned and governed by a consortium of county, metropolitan and borough councils in Yorkshire and the North West England. It provides a wide range of resources and services to schools, councils, charities, emergency services, and other public sector organisations. It claims to be the 'largest formally constituted public sector buying organisation in the UK'.

YPO was formed as the Yorkshire Purchasing Organisation in 1974 as a joint committee of local authorities, and grew through the 1970s and 80s as schools gained power of their own budgets under the Local Management of Schools provisions of the Education Reform Act 1988. The organisation is unsubsidised and budgets to make a small surplus each year, with profits returned to member authorities and customers.

References

Organisations based in Wakefield
Organizations established in 1974
Purchasing consortia
Consortia in the United Kingdom
1974 establishments in the United Kingdom
Government procurement in the United Kingdom